Anatoly Tikhonchik (born 21 January 1976) is a retired Belarusian professional footballer who was a prolific striker of the Belarusian League in 2000s.

Honours
Shakhtyor Soligorsk
Belarusian Cup winner: 2003–04

References

External links 
 Profile at teams.by
 

1976 births
Living people
Belarusian footballers
Belarusian Premier League players
FC Belcard Grodno players
FC Shakhtyor Soligorsk players
FC Gomel players
FC Granit Mikashevichi players
FC Neman Grodno players
FC Veras Nesvizh players
FC Belshina Bobruisk players
FC Uzda players
FC Neman Stolbtsy players
Association football forwards